A House Is Not a Home may refer to:

A House Is Not a Home, a 1953 autobiography by Polly Adler
A House Is Not a Home (film), a 1964 American film
"A House Is Not a Home" (song), a 1964 song by Dionne Warwick and the 1981 cover version by Luther Vandross
"House Is Not a Home", a 2005 song by Deborah Cox

Television 
 A House Is Not a Home (TV series), a 1977 Hong Kong TV series, also known as 家變 (Ga bin)
 "A House Is Not a Home", an episode of Cheers
 "A House Is Not a Home", an episode of Gilmore Girls
 "A House Is Not a Home", an episode of Moesha
 "A House Is Not a Home", an episode of Against the Grain (TV series)